Craig Jones (born 13 April 1978 in Tamworth, New South Wales) was an Australian cricketer. He was a right-handed batsman and a right-arm medium-fast bowler who played for Middlesex in 2005.

Jones, who played one game as a 24-year-old for Middlesex CB, appeared in one game for the county side in 2005, a defeat against Cambridge UCCE. Jones picked up three wickets in the game, but did not bat, and was quickly out of the team.

He injured his back in a subsequent club game and did not return to competitive cricket for two years hence halting his cricket career.

External links
Craig Jones at Cricket Archive 

1978 births
Australian cricketers
Living people
Middlesex cricketers
People from Tamworth, New South Wales
Middlesex Cricket Board cricketers
Cricketers from New South Wales